The hepatopancreas, digestive gland or midgut gland is an organ of the digestive tract of arthropods and molluscs. It provides the functions which in mammals are provided separately by the liver and pancreas, including the production of digestive enzymes, and absorption of digested food.

Arthropods
Arthropods, especially detritivores in the Order Isopoda, Suborder Oniscidea (woodlice), have been shown to be able to store heavy metals in their hepatopancreas. This could lead to bioaccumulation through the food chain and implications for food web destruction, if the accumulation gets high enough in polluted areas; for example, high metal concentrations are seen in spiders of the genus Dysdera which feed on woodlice, including their hepatopancreas, the major metal storage organ of isopods in polluted sites.

Molluscs

The hepatopancreas is a centre for lipid metabolism and for storage of lipids in gastropods.

Some species in the genus Phyllodesmium contains active zooxanthellae of the genus Symbiodinium in the hepatopancreas.

See also
 Crab duplex-specific nuclease
 Digestive system of gastropods
 Tomalley, the hepatopancreas of crustaceans, often used as food

References

Digestive system
Mollusc anatomy
Gastropod anatomy
Arthropod anatomy
Fish anatomy